Rachel Elisabeth Heal (born 1 April 1973) is an English former racing cyclist, who currently works a directeur sportif for UCI Women's Continental Team .

Career

Professional career
Heal originally took up cycling when she was at Birmingham University as a means of transportation. She joined British Cycling's World Class Performance Plan in 2001 to become a full-time cyclist. She turned professional and rode for the Farm Frites team after obtaining a degree in chemical engineering. She has competed in world championships, Commonwealth Games and the Olympic Games. Heal is also a British Cycling level 2 coach, and a qualified personal trainer.

Management career
Heal switched to management when she became co-director of the  team in 2010 alongside team-mate Tina Pic, replacing Iona Wynter. After the Colavita team disbanded at the end of 2011, Heal became director of the new  team for 2012. Heal left the team at the end of 2013 to join , where she made history in 2014 as the first British woman to direct a men's team at a world tour event.

Major results

2001
 2nd Points race, British National Track Championships
 4th Road race, National Road Championships

2002
 1st Stage 5 Gracia–Orlová
 National Road Championships
2nd Road race
3rd Time trial
 2nd WCRA 2 day, Leicestershire
 3rd Road race, Commonwealth Games

2003
 2nd Road race, National Road Championships
 National Track Championships
2nd Points race
3rd Individual pursuit
 3rd Ronde van Drenthe

2004
 1st Stage 7 Tour de l'Aude Féminin
 1st Stage 1b (TTT) Holland Ladies Tour
 2nd Road race, National Road Championships
 3rd National Cyclo-cross Championships
 3rd Points race, National Track Championships
 7th Australia World Cup

2005
 1st Omnium, Aztec Track Meet
 National Road Championships
2nd Road race
2nd Time trial
 National Track Championships
2nd Scratch
2nd Individual pursuit

2006
 1st Tri Peaks Stage Race
 1st Tour of Elk Grove Crit
 4th Overall Tour of the Gila
 Commonwealth Games
5th Road race
5th Time trial

2007
 1st Stage 1 (TTT) Tour de Toona
 2nd Road race, National Road Championships
 2nd Overall Tour of the Gila
1st Stage 1 (ITT)
 7th Women's Cycling Criteriums

2008
 1st Stage 4 Tour of the Gila
 3rd Sea Otter Classic

2009
 7th Sea Otter Circuit Race

References

External links

Results on British Cycling website

1973 births
Living people
People from Bebington
Cyclists at the 2004 Summer Olympics
Olympic cyclists of Great Britain
Commonwealth Games bronze medallists for England
Cyclists at the 2002 Commonwealth Games
English female cyclists
Alumni of the University of Birmingham
Commonwealth Games medallists in cycling
Medallists at the 2002 Commonwealth Games